Et exspecto resurrectionem mortuorum (And I await the resurrection of the dead) is a suite for wind orchestra and percussion instruments by Olivier Messiaen, written in 1964 and first performed the following year. It is composed of five movements.

The piece is dedicated to the dead of the first and second world wars.

History 
Messiaen was approached in October 1963 by André Malraux, Minister of Cultural Affairs under Charles de Gaulle, with a commission for a sacred work to commemorate the dead of the two World Wars. Originally envisioned as a work for chorus, large orchestra and brass, to be performed in June 1964 at the Sainte-Chapelle in Paris and at Notre-Dame de Chartres, the concept of the work and projected date of performance changed several times over the following year. Composition began in early July 1964, while Messiaen was vacationing at the Lac de Pétichet in the Hautes-Alpes, and the orchestration was completed early in January 1965 . The title is taken from the penultimate line of the Nicene Creed: "Et exspecto resurrectionem mortuorum, et vitam venturi sæculi" (And I await the resurrection of the dead, and the life of the coming age).

It was premiered in the Sainte-Chapelle at 11:00 in the morning on 7 May 1965 , and was performed for the second time in the morning of 20 June of the same year following a Solemn Mass at Chartres Cathedral and in the presence of President Charles de Gaulle, who warmly congratulated the composer after the performance . Both performances were conducted by Serge Baudo, and the general rehearsal in Chartres on 19 June was filmed for television, later broadcast in the series Les grandes répétitions .

In his prefaces to the second and third movements, Messiaen also paraphrases passages from "The Resurrection," from the supplement to the third part of the Summa Theologica by Thomas Aquinas .

Instrumentation 
The piece is scored for woodwind, brass and percussion.

Woodwinds
2 piccolos
3 flutes
3 oboes
cor anglais
clarinet in E
3 clarinets
bass clarinet
3 bassoons
contrabassoon

Brass
6 horns
trumpet in D
3 trumpets in C
3 trombones
bass trombone
tuba
bass saxhorn in B

Percussion

tubular bells
6 gongs
3 tam-tams

Movements 

The piece has five movements, lasting approximately 35 minutes in total:

Discography (selected) 

Yvonne Loriod, piano (in Couleurs de la cité céleste); Groupe instrumental à percussion de Strasbourg, Orchestre du Domaine Musical, conductor: Pierre Boulez.
Erato 2292-45505-2/III ECD 71587, 1966-71. Originally issued on LP, 1967.

References

Further reading

Bruhn, Siglind. 2008. Messiaen's Explorations of Love and Death: Musico-poetic Signification in the Tristan Trilogy and Three Related Song Cycles. Hillsdale, NY: Pendragon Press. .
Bruhn, Siglind. 2007. Messiaen's Contemplations of Covenant and Incarnation: Musical Symbols of Faith in the Two Great Piano Cycles of the 1940s. Hillsdale, NY: Pendragon Press. .

 

Compositions by Olivier Messiaen
1964 compositions
Concert band pieces